Howard (also Howard's Landing) was a former Long Island Rail Road station on the Rockaway Beach Branch.  Located on marshland along the coast of Jamaica Bay south of the "WD Tower" near Hawtree Creek, it had no fixed address, and was south of what is today 165th Avenue, evidently within the Gateway National Recreation Area's Hamilton Beach Park.

History
Howard station was originally built in 1898 by the New York and Rockaway Beach Railroad for a hotel and resort built by William H. Howard. The station contained a single plank walk platform over the water along the southbound tracks. Northbound train passengers had to step down into southbound track and walk through southbound cars before entering the hotel. The single platform was extended "several hundred feet" in April 1899, and was given a footpath almost a half-mile long in the Spring of 1900. This included a 34-foot drawbridge that was hand operated and blocked the mouth of Hawtree Creek, much to the dismay of many boaters and fisherman.

A woman who wasn't familiar with the arrangement of the platforms drowned in 1901, when she tried to step off a northbound train at night during high tide and was swept into Jamaica Bay. A northbound platform was added to the station in May 1902. On October 23, 1907, the entire resort including the station was destroyed in a fire. It was never rebuilt.

References

External links
Electrification of Rockaway Beach Branch from Ozone Park to Hammels Wye

Former Long Island Rail Road stations in New York City

Railway stations in Queens, New York
Railway stations in the United States opened in 1898
Railway stations closed in 1907
1898 establishments in New York City
1907 disestablishments in New York (state)
Howard Beach, Queens